The Southern Railway North Avenue Yards, now repurposed as the NorthYards business park, is located just west of the railway line northwest from downtown Atlanta, south of the Marietta Street Artery neighborhood, rich in industrial history. The Yards represent a microcosm in changes in American railroads over the course of the 20th century.

The Southern Railway Company first established the complex, as early as 1911, as a turntable rail yard. The roundhouse (1925) was once used for assembling and servicing trains and, as offsite warehouses were introduced, it was later adapted for use as a warehouse. During the 1950s and 1960s additional warehouses were built surrounding and connected to the roundhouse.

The Roundhouse at Northyards Business Park was renovated and turned into a business park in 2002 by C.D. Moody Construction and won the 2002 Atlanta Urban Design Commission's Award of Excellence.

References

External links
 Marietta Street Artery Association

Historic districts in Atlanta
Rail yards in Georgia (U.S. state)
Historic districts on the National Register of Historic Places in Georgia (U.S. state)
National Register of Historic Places in Atlanta
Rail infrastructure on the National Register of Historic Places in Georgia (U.S. state)
Adaptive reuse of industrial structures in Atlanta